Eriophorum latifolium, commonly known as broad-leaved bog-cotton and broad leaved cotton grass is a species of flowering plant belonging to the family Cyperaceae.

Its native range is Europe to Caucasus, Mongolia, North Korea.

References

latifolium